Sacré-Cœur-de-Jésus is a parish municipality located in Les Appalaches Regional County Municipality in the Chaudière-Appalaches region of Quebec, Canada. Its population was 564 as of the Canada 2011 Census.

The municipality of East Broughton forms an enclave in the territory of Sacré-Cœur-de-Jésus.

Demographics 

References

Commission de toponymie du Québec
Ministère des Affaires municipales, des Régions et de l'Occupation du territoire

Incorporated places in Chaudière-Appalaches
Parish municipalities in Quebec